Gashur-e Amirabad (also Romanized as Gashūr-e Āmīrābād; also known as Gashūr-e Soflá) is a village in Kakavand-e Sharqi Rural District, Kakavand District, Delfan County, Lorestan Province, Iran. At the 2006 census, its population was 66, in 13 families.

References 

Towns and villages in Delfan County